The women's 200 metre freestyle competition at the 1999 Pan Pacific Swimming Championships took place on August 24–25 at the Sydney International Aquatic Centre.  The last champion was Claudia Poll of Costa Rica.

This race consisted of four lengths of the pool, all in freestyle.

Records
Prior to this competition, the existing world and Pan Pacific records were as follows:

Results
All times are in minutes and seconds.

Heats
The first round was held on August 24.

Semifinals
The semifinals were held on August 24.

Final 
The final was held on August 25.

References

1999 Pan Pacific Swimming Championships
1999 in women's swimming